Book of the Week is a BBC Radio 4 series that is broadcast daily on week days. Each week, extracts from the selected book, usually a non-fiction work, are read over five episodes; each fifteen-minute episode is broadcast in the morning (9:45am) and repeated overnight (12:30am). The Act of Worship replaces the morning broadcast in the schedule on longwave.

Featured books
The following articles list books featured from 2012 to 2018.
 List of books featured on Book of the Week in 2012
 List of books featured on Book of the Week in 2013
 List of books featured on Book of the Week in 2014
 List of books featured on Book of the Week in 2015
 List of books featured on Book of the Week in 2016
 List of books featured on Book of the Week in 2017
 List of books featured on Book of the Week in 2018

References
BBC Book of the week website page

BBC Radio 4 programmes